Ptychodes dilloni is a species of beetle in the family Cerambycidae. It was described by Stephan von Breuning in 1949. It is known from Panama.

References

Lamiini
Beetles described in 1949